Miguel Mínguez Ayala (born 30 August 1988 in Bilbao) is a Spanish cyclist. He participated in 3 Giro d'Italias.

Career achievements

Major results
2008
 1st Stage 1 Vuelta a Navarra (TTT)
2009
 10th Overall Cinturó de l'Empordà
2014
 5th Klasika Primavera
 9th Vuelta a Murcia
 10th GP Miguel Indurain

Grand Tour general classification results timeline

References

1988 births
Living people
Spanish male cyclists
Sportspeople from Bilbao
Cyclists from the Basque Country (autonomous community)